is a Japanese surgeon and JAXA astronaut. Furukawa was assigned to the International Space Station as a flight engineer on long-duration missions Expedition 28/29, lifting off 7 June 2011 and returning 22 November 2011.

Medical career
Furakawa graduated from Eiko high school, Kamakura, in 1983; he received a Doctor of Medicine degree from the University of Tokyo in 1989, and a Doctor of Philosophy degree in Medical Science from the same in 2000.

From 1989 to 1999, Furukawa worked in the Department of Surgery at the University of Tokyo, as well as the Department of Anesthesiology at JR Tokyo General Hospital, the Department of Surgery at Ibaraki Prefectural Central Hospital and at Sakuragaoka Hospital.

NASDA/JAXA career
In February 1999, Furukawa was selected by the National Space Development Agency of Japan (NASDA) as one of three Japanese astronaut candidates for the International Space Station (ISS). He started the ISS Astronaut Basic Training program in April 1999 and was certified as an astronaut in January 2001.

Since April 2001, he has been participating in ISS Advanced Training, as well as supporting the development of the hardware and operation of the Japanese ISS Experimental Module “Kibo.”

On October 1, 2003, NASDA merged with ISAS (Institute of Space and Astronautical Science) and NAL (National Aerospace Laboratory of Japan) and was renamed JAXA (Japan Aerospace Exploration Agency).

In May 2004, he completed Soyuz-TMA Flight Engineer-1 training at the Yuri Gagarin Cosmonaut Training Center (GCTC), Star City, Russia.

Furukawa arrived at the Johnson Space Center in June 2004. In February 2006 he completed NASA Astronaut Candidate Training that included scientific and technical briefings, intensive instruction in Shuttle and International Space Station systems, physiological training, T-38 Talon flight training, and water and wilderness survival training. Completion of this initial training qualified him for various technical assignments within the NASA Astronaut Office and for flight assignment as a mission specialist on Space Shuttle missions.

In August 2007, Furukawa served as an aquanaut during the NEEMO 13 project, an exploration research mission held in Aquarius, the world's only undersea research laboratory.

In 2013, Furukawa served as cavenaut into the ESA CAVES training in Sardinia, alongside Jeremy Hansen, Michael Barratt, Jack Fisher, Aleksei Ovchinin and Paolo Nespoli.

He is scheduled to make a second long-duration flight to the ISS sometime in 2023.

Spaceflight experience
Furukawa was assigned as a flight engineer to the International Space Station Expedition 28/29 long duration missions. The Soyuz TMA-02M spacecraft carrying Furukawa, cosmonaut Sergey Volkov and NASA astronaut Michael Fossum lifted off from the Baikonour Cosmodrome on 7 June 2011.   Carrying the same crew, Soyuz TMA-02M undocked from the ISS at 11:00 pm UTC on 21 November 2011. The spacecraft soft-landed safely—albeit on its side—in Kazakhstan at 2:26 am UTC on 22 November.

Personal
Furukawa was born in Yokohama, Kanagawa, Japan. He enjoys baseball, bowling, music and traveling. He is married and has two children.

References

External links

 
 Spacefacts biography of Satoshi Furukawa

1964 births
Living people
Aquanauts
Japanese astronauts
People from Yokohama
Physician astronauts
University of Tokyo alumni